Cyclin-D-binding Myb-like transcription factor 1 is a protein that in humans is encoded by the DMTF1 gene.

References

Further reading